Stephanie Bowman is a Canadian politician, who was elected to the Legislative Assembly of Ontario in the 2022 provincial election. She represents the riding of Don Valley West as a member of the Ontario Liberal Party.

References 

Living people
Ontario Liberal Party MPPs
Politicians from Toronto
Women MPPs in Ontario
21st-century Canadian politicians
21st-century Canadian women politicians
Year of birth missing (living people)